William Theodore Kotcheff (born April 7, 1931) is a Bulgarian-Canadian film and television director, writer and producer, known primarily for his work on British and American television productions, such as Armchair Theatre and Law & Order: Special Victims Unit. He directed numerous successful films including the Australian  Wake in Fright (1971), action films such as the original Rambo movie First Blood (1982) and Uncommon Valor (1983), and comedies like Fun with Dick and Jane (1977), North Dallas Forty (1979), and Weekend at Bernie's (1989). 

He sometimes is credited as William T. Kotcheff, and resides in Beverly Hills, California. Due to his ancestry, Kotcheff has Bulgarian citizenship.

Early life
Kotcheff's name was registered in official documents as William Theodore Kotcheff  in Toronto, where he was born into a family of Bulgarian immigrants, who changed their last name from Tsochev to Kotcheff for convenience. His father was born in Plovdiv, and his mother was of Macedonian Bulgarian background, from Vambel, today in Greece, but grew up in Varna, Bulgaria.

Career

Canadian television
After graduating in English Literature from University College, University of Toronto, Kotcheff began his television career at the age of twenty-four when he joined the staff of the Canadian Broadcasting Corporation, with television in its infancy. Kotcheff was the youngest director on the staff of the CBC, where he worked for two years on shows such as General Motors Theatre, Encounter, First Performance and On Camera.

British television
In 1958, he left Canada to live and work in the United Kingdom. He was soon followed by his compatriot Sydney Newman, who had been the Director of Drama at the CBC and then to the United Kingdom to take up a similar position at ABC Weekend TV, one of the franchise holders of the ITV network who also produced much of the nationally networked programming for the channel.

At ABC, Newman as producer of the popular Armchair Theatre anthology drama programme, on which Kotcheff worked as a director between 1957 and 1960. Kotcheff was responsible for directing some of the best-remembered instalments in the series. During Underground, transmitted live on 30 November 1958, Kotcheff was required to cope when one of the actors, Gareth Jones, playing a character who was to die of a heart attack, suddenly died of one himself, off-camera, while between scenes, leaving Peter Bowles and others to improvise. 

More successfully, Kotcheff also directed the following year's No Trams to Lime Street by Welsh playwright Alun Owen. He also did Hour of Mystery, I'll Have You to Remember (1961) by Clive Exton, and episodes of BBC Sunday-Night Play, ITV Television Playhouse, Espionage, First Night, ABC Stage 67, Drama 61-67 and ITV Playhouse.

Theatre
Kotcheff also worked in the theatre.

British feature films
Kotcheff made his first film with Tiara Tahiti (1962). He directed other features during the decade, including Life at the Top (1965) and Two Gentlemen Sharing (1969).

He also directed The Human Voice (1967) for British television, starring Ingrid Bergman from a story by Jean Cocteau and TV remakes of The Desperate Hours (1967) and Of Mice and Men (1968). He directed the concert At the Drop of Another Hat for TV.

Kotcheff directed the Australian film Wake in Fright (USA: Outback, 1971; re-released with its original title, 2012). It won much critical acclaim in Europe, and was Australia's entry at the Cannes Film Festival. (In 2009, Wake in Fright was re-released on DVD and Blu-ray disc in a fully restored version.) 

Kotcheff returned to television, directing the Play for Today production Edna, the Inebriate Woman (1971) for the BBC, which won him a British Academy Television Award for Best Director. In 2000, the play was voted one of the 100 Greatest British Television Programmes of the 20th century in a poll of industry professionals conducted by the British Film Institute.

Return to Canada
He returned home to Canada, where he directed an adaptation of his friend and one-time housemate Mordecai Richler's novel The Apprenticeship of Duddy Kravitz (1974) which won the Golden Bear at the Berlin Film Festival making it the first English Canadian dramatic feature film to win an international award.

He wrote and directed The Trial of Sinyavsky and Daniel (1975) for Canadian television and was a production consultant on Why Shoot the Teacher? (1977).

Hollywood
In Hollywood, he directed Fun with Dick and Jane (1977) which was a big hit. He followed it with the comedy Who Is Killing the Great Chefs of Europe? (1978) then wrote and directed North Dallas Forty (1979) which was critically acclaimed.

Kotcheff directed the Canadian film Split Image (1982), then had his biggest success to date with the Sylvester Stallone movie First Blood (1982), the first in the Rambo series. He worked on another Vietnam-themed action movie Uncommon Valor (1983), then returned to Canada to make Joshua Then and Now (1985), from the novel by Mordecai Richler.

Kotcheff directed Switching Channels (1988) and Winter People (1989), then had a big hit with Weekend at Bernie's (1989).

Television
In the 1990s, Kotcheff returned to directing for TV, working on various American series such as Red Shoe Diaries, and Buddy Faro as well as Casualty in the UK.

He did the occasional feature film such as Folks! (1992) and The Shooter (1995). He did TV movies like What Are Families for? (1993), Love on the Run (1994), Family of Cops (1995), A Husband, a Wife and a Lover (1996), Borrowed Hearts (1997), Cry Rape (1999). He joined the staff of Law & Order: Special Victims Unit, where he acts as executive producer and director.

Personal life
Kotcheff lives in Beverly Hills with his wife Laifun. They have two children: Alexandra, a filmmaker, and Thomas, a composer and pianist. He has three children from his previous marriage to actress Sylvia Kay: Aaron, Katrina and Joshua.. Ted Kotcheff is also vegetarian.

In May and June 2013, he was invited to the Film Forum in New York City for a re-release of his film The Apprenticeship of Duddy Kravitz, restored by the Academy of Canadian Cinema & Television.

In February 2016, Kotcheff applied for Bulgarian citizenship via the Bulgarian consulate in Los Angeles, and was granted this during a visit to Bulgaria in March. 

Given his Macedonian heritage, Kotcheff served on the board of directors of the Macedonian Arts Council. According to Kotcheff, there is not a difference between Macedonia and Bulgaria.

Filmography
Director (Film)

Tiara Tahiti (1962)
Life at the Top (1965)
Two Gentlemen Sharing (1969)
Wake in Fright (1971)
The Apprenticeship of Duddy Kravitz (1974)
Billy Two Hats (1974)
Fun with Dick and Jane (1977)
Who Is Killing the Great Chefs of Europe? (1978)
North Dallas Forty (1979)
Split Image (1982)
First Blood (1982)
Uncommon Valor (1983)
Joshua Then and Now (1985)
Switching Channels (1988)
Weekend at Bernie's (1989)
Winter People (1989)
Folks! (1992)
The Shooter (1995)
Borrowed Hearts (1997)

Director (Television)

On Camera (1956)—as W.T. Kotcheff
Hour of Mystery (1957)
Underground (1958)
No Trams to Lime Street (1959)
After the Funeral (1960)
Lena, O My Lena (1960)
I'll Have You Remember (1961)
BBC Sunday-Night Play (1962-1963)
ITV Television Playhouse (1963)
Espionage (1963)
Land of My Dreams (1964)
First Night (1963-1964)
Drama 64 (1964)
Armchair Theatre (1958-1964)
The Human Voice (1967)
The Desperate Hours (1967)
Edna, the Inebriate Woman (1971)
What Are Families for? (1993)
Red Shoe Diaries 3: Another Woman's Lipstick (1993)
Love on the Run (1994)
A Family of Cops (1995)
Red Shoe Diaries 5: Weekend Pass (1995)
A Husband, a Wife and a Lover (1996)
Buddy Faro (1998)
Law & Order: Special Victims Unit (1999)
Crime in Connecticut: The Story of Alex Kelly (1999)

Honors

References

External links
 
 Canadian Film Encyclopedia
 Ted Kotcheff's appearances on Combat Radio

1931 births
Living people
Canadian people of Bulgarian descent
Canadian television directors
Comedy film directors
University of Toronto alumni
Film directors from Toronto
Action film directors
Directors of Golden Bear winners